The European Centre for Antiziganism Research (ECAR) is a not-for-profit organization dedicated to combating Antiziganism, or prejudice against Romani people, also known as Gypsies.

ECAR gained headlines worldwide when it filed a complaint with German prosecutors against the movie Borat: Cultural Learnings of America for Make Benefit Glorious Nation of Kazakhstan for defamation and inciting violence against the Romani people.

See also
 Antiziganism

External links

Borat Lawsuits

Antiziganism in Europe
Romani advocacy
Romani in Europe